Lipez may refer to:

Geography
 Cerro Lípez, stratovolcano in Bolivia
 Cordillera de Lípez, mountain range in Bolivia
 Nor Lípez Native Community Lands, indigenous territory in Bolivia
 Nor Lípez Province, province in Bolivia
 Río Grande de Lipez, river of Bolivia
 San Pablo de Lípez, town in Bolivia
 Sur Lípez Province, province in Bolivia

People
 Kermit Lipez (born 1941), United States Circuit Judge
 Richard Lipez (1938–2022), American journalist and writer